The Korea Coal Corporation, also known as Korea Coal or KOCOAL, is a government-owned corporation which oversees the coal-mining industry in South Korea.  Its headquarters are located in Seoul, in Sangam-dong, Mapo-gu.

Korea Coal operates three domestic anthracite coal mines, producing approximately 1.2 million metric tons annually.  This is down from a peak of 5.2 million tons reached in 1988.  As domestic demand for bituminous coal has grown, exceeding 70 million tons in 2005, the company has reduced its Korean operations and begun to invest in overseas mines.

The company was initially formed in 1950, under the First Republic of South Korea. It was the successor to a Japanese government corporation set up under Japanese rule, when large-scale coal-mining in Korea began.

See also
Economy of South Korea
Government of South Korea

Coal companies of South Korea
Mining in South Korea